Francisco León is one of the 119 Municipalities of Chiapas, in southern Mexico. It covers an area of 114.3 km². In 1982 parts of the municipality were buried in the eruption of El Chichón Volcano.

As of 2010, the municipality had a total population of 7,000, up from 5,236 as of 2005.

The municipality had 50 localities, the largest of which (with 2010 populations in parentheses) was: San Miguel la Sardina (1,106), classified as rural.

References

Municipalities of Chiapas